One Night Only is a series of professional wrestling events held by Impact Wrestling (formally known as Total Nonstop Action (TNA) Wrestling, and briefly rebranded to Global Force Wrestling) in 2017.

One Night Only: Live!

One Night Only: Live! was a professional wrestling pay-per-view (PPV) event produced by Total Nonstop Action Wrestling (TNA). It took place on January 6, 2017, at the Impact Zone in Universal Studios in Orlando, Florida.

 TNA X Division Championship match

Joker's Wild 2017

One Night Only: Joker's Wild 2017 was a professional wrestling pay-per-view (PPV) event produced by Total Nonstop Action Wrestling (TNA). The tournament consists of tag team matches in which the partners are randomly drawn in a lottery, with the winning teams advancing to the main event battle royal, for a grand prize of $100,000. It aired on February 10, 2017, from the Impact Zone in Universal Studios in Orlando, Florida.

 Gauntlet Battle Royal

Rivals 2017

One Night Only: Rivals 2017 was a professional wrestling pay-per-view (PPV) event produced by Total Nonstop Action Wrestling (TNA). The event includes wrestlers with current and past rivalries facing-off with one another in matches. The event featured the return of Angelina Love. It was the final event produced under the TNA Wrestling brand.

Victory Road – Knockouts Knockdown

One Night Only: Victory Road – Knockouts Knockdown was a professional wrestling pay-per-view (PPV) event produced by Impact Wrestling, where a series of matches are held, featuring eight Knockouts going up against eight independent wrestlers. The winner of these matches would advance to a four-on-four tag team match at the end of the night, with the last Knockout standing receiving an Impact Wrestling contract. Matches were filmed on March 3–4, 2017, from the Impact Zone in Universal Studios in Orlando, Florida.

Turning Point 2017

One Night Only: Turning Point 2017 was a professional wrestling pay-per-view (PPV) event produced by Impact Wrestling, matches were filmed on April 22, 2017, from the Impact Zone in Universal Studios in Orlando, Florida.

No Surrender 2017

One Night Only: No Surrender 2017 was a professional wrestling pay-per-view (PPV) event produced by Impact Wrestling, matches were filmed on April 23, 2017, from the Impact Zone in Universal Studios in Orlando, Florida.

GFW Amped Anthology

GFW Amped Anthology – Part 1

One Night Only: GFW Amped Anthology – Part 1 was produced by Global Force Wrestling (GFW) and consists of matches that were taped for what would have been GFW's television series, Amped. The matches were filmed on July 24, 2015, from the Orleans Arena in Paradise, Nevada.

GFW Amped Anthology – Part 2

One Night Only: GFW Amped Anthology – Part 2 was produced by Global Force Wrestling (GFW) and consists of matches that were taped for what would have been GFW's television series, Amped. Matches were filmed on July 25, 2015, from the Orleans Arena in Paradise, Nevada.

GFW Amped Anthology – Part 3

One Night Only: GFW Amped Anthology – Part 3 was produced by Global Force Wrestling (GFW) and consists of matches that were taped for what would have been GFW's television series, Amped. Matches were filmed on August 21, 2015, from the Orleans Arena in Paradise, Nevada.

GFW Amped Anthology – Part 4

One Night Only: GFW Amped Anthology – Part 4  was produced by Global Force Wrestling (GFW) and consists of matches that were taped for what would have been GFW's television series, Amped. Matches were filmed on October 23, 2015, from the Orleans Arena in Paradise, Nevada.

References

2017 in professional wrestling
Professional wrestling shows in Orlando, Florida
Professional wrestling shows in the Las Vegas Valley
2017
2017 in professional wrestling in Florida
2017 in Nevada
Global Force Wrestling